Karuna Trust (UK) is a charity based in London. It was established in 1980 under the name ‘Aid for India’, and linked to the Triratna Buddhist Community. It is administered by Western Buddhists, but the projects are open to anyone regardless of background. Fundraising comes partly from the UK general public and partly from British Buddhists associated with the Triratna movement; but there are also international spin-offs like Karuna Germany. Also at times project-based funding is applied for from institutional donors.

Their projects aim at promoting dignity and self-confidence, and the breaking down of caste and religious barriers. Many of their projects are administered and run by members of the beneficiary community. For example, most of the projects for India’s Dalit (ex-'untouchable') community are run by Bahujan Hitay/TBMSG, a network of Dalit-run organisations based in Maharashtra. From their original starting point of Indian Dalits, their scope has widened. Karuna now works in fifteen Indian states, and is for example, also helping the marginalized and previously neglected Adivasi 'tribal' people. They have also worked in Bangladesh, Nepal and Tibet, supporting self-help projects that build dignity and challenge discrimination.

Dame Judi Dench is patron of the Karuna Trust.

References

External links 
 Official website

Buddhist charities
Development charities based in the United Kingdom
Foreign charities operating in India
Religious organizations established in 1980